The Hôtel Tubeuf or Hôtel Duret-de-Chevry is a hôtel particulier located at 8 Rue des Petits Champs in the 2nd arrondissement of Paris. It was unfinished, when in 1641 it was purchased by the financier Jacques Tubeuf, who sold it to Cardinal Mazarin in 1649. The latter expanded it and combined it with adjacent hôtels, creating the Palais Mazarin, which in 1721 became the Bibliothèque du Roi (King's Library). The Hôtel Tubeuf is now part of the complex of buildings forming the Richelieu site of the Bibliothèque nationale de France and was declared a monument historique in 1983.

The Hôtel Tubeuf is a typical hôtel particulier with a central corps de logis set between an entrance courtyard and a garden. The entrance courtyard is on the south side and was formerly enclosed on all sides. The street entrance seen today was constructed in the 18th century. The street facade as it existed in the 17th century can be seen in an engraving by Jean Marot.

The Hôtel Tubeuf is one of the last and most splendid examples in Paris of brick-and-stone architecture (popular in France in the early 17th century). Brick-and-stone had already gone out of style at the time this hôtel was built, but was used at the request of Duret. The building reflects the architect's fondness for elaborate rustication, stone chaines and quoins, and uncommonly shaped pediments decorated in low-relief.

A garden gallery, designed by François Mansart ca. 1644–45, was later added to the Hôtel Tubeuf. Of Mansart's designs only the exterior, and not the interior, of the garden gallery survives in somewhat altered form, with crossed quivers and garlands typical of Mansart visible above the upper windows.

The Louisiana Purchase Treaty was signed at the Hôtel Tubeuf on 30 April 1803.

The Hôtel Tubeuf now hosts the departments of prints and photographs (Département des estampes et de la photographie) and of maps and plans (Département des cartes et plans) of the French National Library.

See also
 Hôtel de Nevers (rue de Richelieu)
 Hôtel de Nevers (left bank)
 Hôtel Duret de Chevry, rue de Parc-Royal
 Place Dauphine

Notes

Bibliography
 Ayers, Andrew (2004). The Architecture of Paris. Stuttgart; London: Edition Axel Menges. .
 Babelon, Jean-Pierre (1996). "Thiriot, Jean", vol. 30, p. 734–735, in The Dictionary of Art (34 vols.), edited by Jane Turner. New York: Grove. .
 Blunt, Anthony; Beresford, Richard (1999). Art and Architecture in France, 1500–1700, 5th edition. New Haven, Connecticut: Yale University Press. .
 Braham, Allan; Smith, Peter (1973). François Mansart, 2 volumes. London: A. Zwemmer. .
 Chappet, Alain; Martin, Roger; Pigeard, Alain (2005). Le guide de Napoleon: 4000 lieux de mémoire pour revivre l'épopée. Paris: Tallandier. .
 Deutsch, Kristina (2015). Jean Marot : Un graveur d'architecture à l'époque de Louis XIV. Berlin: De Gruyter. .

Tubeuf
Buildings and structures in the 2nd arrondissement of Paris
Buildings and structures completed in 1635
1635 establishments in France